"Cold War" is a science fiction short story by British writer Arthur C. Clarke, first published in 1956, and later anthologized in Tales from the White Hart. Like the rest of the collection, it is a frame story set in the fictional "White Hart" pub, where Harry Purvis narrates the secondary tale.

Plot
The story narrated by Purvis describes a scheme allegedly designed by the state of California to discredit Florida's claim to being America's sunniest state. A friend of Purvis', who was once a submarine commander, is hired to captain a submarine carrying an ice-machine out into the Atlantic Ocean, and create a small ice-berg there. The iceberg would then drift to the Florida coast, and the resulting news sensation would then damage Florida's reputation for being warm. While creating the iceberg, however, they happen to choose a spot that was close to an American missile testing range, and a missile comes down near them. Assuming that it is an airplane in trouble, they investigate, only to find that a Russian submarine is trying to appropriate the missile. They manage to frighten away the Russians, and rescue the missile. The iceberg scheme is abandoned.

Publication
Originally published in the magazine Satellite Science Fiction, the piece was later published as the twelfth story in Clarke's collection Tales from the White Hart. Galaxy reviewer Floyd C. Gale praised the collection as "as light and frothy a conglomeration of sidesplitters as it has been my good fortune to read."

References

External links 
 

Short stories by Arthur C. Clarke
1957 short stories
Tales from the White Hart